The Thing to Do is an album by American trumpeter Blue Mitchell recorded in 1964 and released on the Blue Note label.

Reception

The AllMusic review by Scott Yanow awarded the album 5 stars and stated "The record is prime Blue Note hard bop, containing inventive tunes, meaningful solos, and an enthusiastic but tight feel. Highly recommended".

Track listing
 "Fungii Mama" (Mitchell) - 7:49
 "Mona's Mood" (Heath) - 5:18
 "The Thing to Do" (Heath) - 7:08
 "Step Lightly" (Henderson) - 10:27
 "Chick's Tune" (Corea) - 9:36

Personnel
Blue Mitchell - trumpet
Junior Cook - tenor saxophone
Chick Corea - piano
Gene Taylor - bass
Al Foster - drums

References

Blue Note Records albums
Blue Mitchell albums
1965 albums
Hard bop albums
Albums recorded at Van Gelder Studio
Albums produced by Alfred Lion